Tiago Filipe Sousa Nóbrega Rodrigues (born 29 January 1992) is a Portuguese professional footballer who plays as a midfielder for TFF First League club Gençlerbirliği.

Club career
Born in Vila Real, Vila Real District, Rodrigues played youth football with three clubs, including Sporting CP and Vitória de Guimarães. Loaned by the latter, he made his senior debut with Amarante F.C. in the third division.

Returned to the Minho side for 2012–13, Rodrigues initially represented both the A and B teams, the latter competing in the Segunda Liga. He made his Primeira Liga debut for the former on 21 September 2012, playing the second half in the 1–0 away win against Moreirense FC. He also featured the full 90 minutes in that season's Taça de Portugal final, a 2–1 victory over S.L. Benfica which was Vitória's first-ever win in the tournament.

On 16 April 2013, before the campaign was over, Rodrigues agreed to join FC Porto on 1 July, moving alongside teammate Ricardo. He never represented the first team in competitive games, going on to appear for their reserves as well as being loaned to Guimarães, C.D. Nacional (twice) and C.S. Marítimo.

Rodrigues signed a two-year deal with Bulgarian club PFC CSKA Sofia on 1 July 2017. On 14 January 2019, he extended his contract until June 2022; he eventually became the highest-scoring foreign player (alongside Fernando Karanga) in The Eternal Derby, totalling three goals.

Rodrigues continued playing abroad the following seasons, with Al-Hazem F.C. in the Saudi Professional League and FC Ufa in the Russian Premier League. On 5 January 2023, he joined TFF First League club Gençlerbirliği S.K. on a one-and-a-half-year contract.

Career statistics

Club

1 Includes UEFA Champions League and UEFA Europa League matches.

2 Includes Taça da Liga, Supertaça Cândido de Oliveira and Bulgarian Supercup matches.

Honours
Vitória de Guimarães
Taça de Portugal: 2012–13

CSKA Sofia
Bulgarian Cup: 2020–21

References

External links

1992 births
Living people
People from Vila Real, Portugal
Sportspeople from Vila Real District
Portuguese footballers
Association football midfielders
Primeira Liga players
Liga Portugal 2 players
Segunda Divisão players
Amarante F.C. players
Vitória S.C. B players
Vitória S.C. players
FC Porto B players
C.D. Nacional players
C.S. Marítimo players
First Professional Football League (Bulgaria) players
PFC CSKA Sofia players
Saudi Professional League players
Al-Hazem F.C. players
Russian Premier League players
FC Ufa players
TFF First League players
Gençlerbirliği S.K. footballers
Portugal youth international footballers
Portugal under-21 international footballers
Portuguese expatriate footballers
Expatriate footballers in Bulgaria
Expatriate footballers in Saudi Arabia
Expatriate footballers in Russia
Expatriate footballers in Turkey
Portuguese expatriate sportspeople in Bulgaria
Portuguese expatriate sportspeople in Saudi Arabia
Portuguese expatriate sportspeople in Russia
Portuguese expatriate sportspeople in Turkey